The 2002–03 LEN Champions League was the 40th edition of LEN's premier competition for men's water polo clubs. It ran from 16 October 2002 to 17 May 2003, and it was contested by 29 teams. The Final Four (semifinals, final, and third place game) took place on May 16 and May 17 in Genoa.

Preliminary round

Blue Group

Red Group

Final Four (Genoa)

Final standings

See also
2002–03 LEN Cup Winners' Cup
2002–03 LEN Cup

LEN Champions League seasons
Champions League
2002 in water polo
2003 in water polo